Bezdek may refer to:

People
 Hugo Bezdek, a Czech-American sports figure 
 Károly Bezdek, a professor of mathematics at the University of Calgary
 Pavel Bezdek, a Czech actor and stunt performer
 Rudolf Bezděk, a Czech boxer who competed in the 1936 Summer Olympics.

Other
 23199 Bezdek a main belt asteroid